Kushmandi (also referred to as Kushmundi) is a village in Kushmandi CD Block in Gangarampur subdivision of Dakshin Dinajpur district in the state of West Bengal, India.

Geography

Location
Kushmandi is located at 

In the map alongside, all places marked on the map are linked in the full screen version.

Police station
Kushmandi police station under West Bengal police has jurisdiction over Kushmandi CD Block.

CD block HQ
The headquarters of Kushmandi CD block is at Kushmandi.

Demographics
As per the 2011 Census of India, Kushmundi had a total population of 3,948, of which 1,999 (51%) were males and 1,949 (49%) were females. Population below 6 years was 371. The total number of literates in Kushmundi was 3,104 (86.78% of the population over 6 years).

Transport
State Highway 10A passes through Kushmandi.

New broad gauge line from Kaliaganj to Buniadpur (33.10 km), passing through Kushmandi, was included in the budget 2010–11.  157.938 ha of land to be acquired. As of August 2018, project work by Northeast Frontier Railway held up mainly because of paucity of funds.

Education
Kushmandi Government College was established at Kushmandi in 2015. It is affiliated to Gour Banga University and offers honours courses in Bengali, English, history, philosophy and political science, and general courses in arts and science.

Healthcare
Kushmandi Rural Hospital at Kushmandi (with 30 beds) is the main medical facility in Kushmandi CD Block. There are primary health centres at Sehail (Nanaharpara PHC) (with10 beds) and Aminpur (with 10 beds).

References

Villages in Dakshin Dinajpur district